Peanut is an unincorporated community in Trinity County, California.

History
A post office called Peanut was established in 1900, and remained in operation until it was discontinued in 1933. The first postmaster's fondness of peanuts caused the name to be selected.

References

Unincorporated communities in Trinity County, California
Unincorporated communities in California